Mulpani may refer to several places:

Nepal 
 Mulpani, Baglung
 Mulpani, Dhading
 Mulpani, Kathmandu
 Mulpani, Bhojpur